Babang may refer to:

Battle of Babang of 1965
Babang Township, Sichuan, a village in Sichuan and historical name of Palpung Monastery 
Babang (Bhutan), a village in southern Bhutan

See also 
 Babang luksa (disambiguation)